Double Up may refer to:

Art 
 Double Up (sculpture), a public artwork, by Clement Meadmore, in Wisconsin, U.S.

Music 
 Double Up (Mase album), 1999
 Double Up (R. Kelly album), 2007
 "Double Up" (R. Kelly song), the title song, featuring Snoop Dogg
 "Double Up" (Nipsey Hussle song)

Television 
 Double Up (Canadian game show), a 1974 quiz show
 Double Up (American game show), a 1992 dating game show
 Pinoy Big Brother: Double Up, the 2009 third season of the Filipino reality TV series Pinoy Big Brother

Sports 

 Generally refers to putting out a runner in baseball who had to tag up